The Health and Safety Authority (HSA) is the national body in Ireland with responsibility for occupational health and safety. Its role is to secure health and safety at work. It is an Irish state-sponsored body, established under the Safety, Health and Welfare at Work Act, 1989 and reports to the Minister for Enterprise, Trade and Employment.

The Authority consults widely with employers, employees and their respective organisations. To help develop sound policies and good workplace practices, the Authority works with various Advisory Committees and Task Forces etc. which focus on specific occupations and hazards.

The HSA has overall responsibility for the administration and enforcement of health and safety at work in Ireland.  The HSA monitors compliance with legislation at the workplace and can take enforcement action (up to and including prosecutions).

The HSA is the national centre for information and advice to employers, employees and self-employed on all aspects of workplace health and safety.  The Authority also promotes education, training and research in the field.

Occupational safety and health policy at national level is determined by a twelve-member, tripartite Board, with nominees from the social partners and other interests concerned with safety and health in the workplace. The appointment of the Board of the Authority is a function of the Minister for Enterprise, Trade and Employment under the Safety, Health and Welfare at Work Act, 1989.

It operates from eight offices across Ireland: the Dublin headquarters and offices in Kilkenny, Athlone, Cork, Galway, Limerick, Sligo and Waterford.

External links
HSA website

Government agencies of the Republic of Ireland
Occupational safety and health organizations
Medical and health organisations based in the Republic of Ireland